Ford House or Ford Farm or variations may refer to:

United Kingdom
Forde House, (anciently "Ford"), Wolborough, Newton Abbot, Devon

United States
Henry and Cornelia Ford Farm, Lexa, AR, listed on the NRHP in Arkansas
Zachariah Ford House, Pleasant Grove, AR, listed on the NRHP in Arkansas
Barney L. Ford Building, Denver, CO, listed on the NRHP in Colorado
Justina Ford House, Denver, CO, listed on the NRHP in Colorado
Fair Lane, the Henry Ford Estate in Dearborn, Michigan
Edison and Ford Winter Estates, the Henry Ford Winter Estate in Fort Myers, Florida, listed on the NRHP in Florida
Joseph Ford House, Cave Spring, GA, listed on the NRHP in Georgia
W.T. Ford House, Earlham, IA, listed on the NRHP in Iowa
Arthur Hillyer Ford House, Iowa City, IA, listed on the NRHP in Iowa
Ford Stone House, Elliston, Kentucky, listed on the NRHP in Kentucky
William Ford House, Brownsville, KY, listed on the NRHP in Kentucky
Ford House (Owenton, Kentucky), listed on the NRHP in Kentucky
John Jackson Ford House, Smiths Grove, KY, listed on the NRHP in Kentucky
Henry Ford Square House, Garden City, MI, listed on the NRHP in Michigan
President Gerald R. Ford Jr. Boyhood Home, Grand Rapids, MI, listed on the NRHP in Michigan
Hebard–Ford Summer House, L'Anse, MI, listed on the NRHP in Michigan
Edsel and Eleanor Ford House, 1100 Lakeshore Rd, Grosse Pointe Shores, MI, listed on the NRHP in Michigan
Ford–Bacon House, Wyandotte, MI, listed on the NRHP in Michigan
Ford–Williams House, Energy, MS, listed on the NRHP in Mississippi
Mayor Ebb Ford House, Pascagoula, MS, listed on the NRHP in Mississippi
Ford House (Sandy Hook, Mississippi), listed on the NRHP in Mississippi
Lee M. Ford House, Great Falls, MT, listed on the NRHP in Montana
Ford–Faesch House, Rockaway Township, NJ, listed on the NRHP in New Jersey
Samuel Ford Jr.'s Hammock Farm, Florham Park, NJ, listed on the NRHP in New Jersey
Lebbeus Ford House, Berkshire, NY, listed on the NRHP in New York
Jacob Ford House, Morristown, NY, listed on the NRHP in New York
Charles Ford House, Orleans, NY, listed on the NRHP in New York
James Ford House, Lawrenceville, PA, listed on the NRHP in Pennsylvania
President Gerald R. Ford Jr. House, Alexandria, VA, listed on the NRHP in Virginia
Ford–Rigby House, Centerville, UT, listed on the NRHP in Utah
Joseph N. and Algie Ford House, Centerville, UT, listed on the NRHP in Utah
Ford House (Morgantown, West Virginia), listed on the NRHP in West Virginia

See also
Henry Ford House (disambiguation)